WJBC-FM (93.7 MHz) is a commercial FM radio station licensed to Pontiac, Illinois, in the Bloomington-Normal radio market.  It is owned by Cumulus Media and broadcasts a Country radio format, calling itself "93.7 Nash Icon."  The transmitter is on County Road 3200 North in Weston, Illinois.

History
It had 3,000 watts and broadcast on 103.1 MHz. It used the call sign WPOK-FM, simulcasting its sister station 1080 WPOK (AM), now off the air.  

WPOK-FM changed its call sign to WJEZ in November 1984. The AM station went off the air in 1998.  

WJEZ was a modern country station by 1989, and received authorization to move from 103.1 MHz to 93.7 MHz in the early 1990s.

In 2003, the WJEZ callsign was moved to sister station 98.9 at Dwight, Illinois; that station still remains WJEZ .  93.7 became WTRX-FM, a classic rock station with the nickname "Thunder 93.7 WTRX".  It later became "WTRX, The Oldies Channel", from the name of the Westwood One's music network format it used; the music network was purchased by Dial Global and WTRX-FM began using Dial Global's Kool Gold format, except during mornings.

In 2010, the station changed its call sign to WJBC-FM and began simulcasting the talk radio format on sister station 1230 WJBC (AM) in Bloomington.  On August 15, 2014, at 3pm, WJBC-FM split from the simulcast and became one of the first stations to flip to the new "Nash Icon" country network as 93.7 Nash Icon.

Past Logos

References

External links

Radio stations established in 1969
JBC-FM
Country radio stations in the United States
Pontiac, Illinois
1969 establishments in Illinois
Cumulus Media radio stations